Lamborghini is an Italian manufacturer of high performance sports cars, now a subsidiary of Audi AG

Lamborghini may also refer to:

People

Ferruccio Lamborghini (1916–1993), founder of the auto and tractor manufacturing companies
Elettra Lamborghini, Italian TV personality
Osvaldo Lamborghini (1940–1985), Argentine writer

Other uses
Lamborghini Trattori, former Italian manufacturer of tractors, now a brand of Same Deutz-Fahr
Automobili Lamborghini (video game), a video game released in 1997
 Lamborghini: The Man Behind the Legend, a 2022 American film
Lamborghini (video game), a cancelled racing video game by Rage Software
"Lamborghini" (song), a 2015 song by KSI featuring P Money
"Lamberghini" (song), a Punjabi song by The Doorbeen featuring Ragini Tandan